Lee Quarry is a mountain bike trail located near Bacup and Stacksteads in Rossendale Valley, Lancashire. Originally a working quarry, the quarry alongside its neighbour Cragg Quarry have been transformed. The trail was set up by Lancashire County Council and is free to use.

Routes
There are two main routes around the quarry known as the 'Red' and 'Black' routes, which are for less and more experienced cyclists respectively. The 'Pump Tracks' are generally used as a practise loop before attempting the main routes. Nearby Cragg Quarry is reached by a newly constructed bridleway link over Brandwood Lower end moor.

References

Borough of Rossendale
Mountain biking venues in the United Kingdom